The Department of Supply was an Australian government department that existed between March 1950 and June 1974.

History
Established in 1950, the Department of Supply headquarters transferred to Canberra in January 1968. 

In 1964 the Department won the Export Award for its contribution to Australia's export income and for its role in elevating Australia's international reputation in the field of advanced technology.

The Department was dissolved in 1974.

Scope
Information about the department's functions and/or government funding allocation could be found in the Administrative Arrangements Orders, the annual Portfolio Budget Statements and in the Department's annual reports.

The functions of the Department at its creation in 1950 were:
Australian Aluminium Production Commission
Control of materials which are or may be used in producing atomic energy 
Manufacture, acquisition, provision and supply of war material involving operation and management of factories, workshops and undertakings concerned in the production of war material
Acquisition by the Commonwealth and the establishment of factories and workshops for the purpose of producing war material
Securing of supplies of materials, plant, tools and equipment for that purpose
Employment and training of technicians, workmen and others for that purpose
Arrangements and all action necessary to secure the supply, manufacture, processing and delivery of war material 
Building of merchant ships and other vessels (other than naval vessels) and repair and maintenance of all merchant ships and the provision of dry-docking and repairing facilities for merchant ships
Control and limitation of profits in relation to the production of war material by private enterprise
Promotion and production of liquid fuels, and in particular, the production of power alcohol and benzol
Importation and use of tin plate
Procurement of supplies and foodstuffs for the Services and control of the production and distribution of supplies where their conservation is necessary

Structure
The Department was a Commonwealth Public Service department, staffed by officials who were responsible to the Minister for Supply.

References

Supply
Ministries established in 1950